Mauro Schmid (born 4 December 1999 in Bülach) is a Swiss cyclist, who currently rides for UCI WorldTeam . He competed in the scratch at the 2019 UCI Track Cycling World Championships, where he finished 7th.

Major results

Road

2017
 National Junior Championships
2nd Road race
2nd Time trial
 3rd Overall GP Général Patton
2018
 2nd Overall Tour of Black Sea
2019
 National Under-23 Championships
1st  Road race
3rd Time trial
2020
 4th Time trial, National Under-23 Championships
2021
 1st Stage 11 Giro d'Italia
 4th Time trial, National Championships
2022
 1st  Team relay, UCI World Championships
 1st  Overall Tour of Belgium
 1st Stage 1 Settimana Internazionale di Coppi e Bartali
 National Championships
2nd Time trial
4th Road race
 6th Overall Danmark Rundt
 6th Grand Prix Cycliste de Montréal
 10th Overall Tour of Oman
2023
 1st Stage 2 (TTT) UAE Tour
 5th Overall Tour Down Under

Grand Tour general classification results timeline

Track
2017
 UEC European Junior Championships
3rd  Points
3rd  Team pursuit
2018
 3rd Individual pursuit, National Championships
2019
 UEC European Under-23 Championships
3rd  Team pursuit
3rd  Madison (with Robin Froidevaux)
2020
 UCI World Cup
1st Team pursuit, Cambridge
3rd Team pursuit, Brisbane

Cyclo-cross
2015–2016
 2nd National Junior Championships
2016–2017
 2nd National Junior Championships
 3rd Junior Fae' di Oderzo

References

External links

1999 births
Living people
People from Bülach
Swiss male cyclists
Swiss track cyclists
Swiss Giro d'Italia stage winners
Olympic cyclists of Switzerland
Cyclists at the 2020 Summer Olympics
Sportspeople from the canton of Zürich
UCI Road World Champions (elite men)